A linkage institution is a structure within a society that connects the people to the government or centralized authority. These institutions include: elections, political parties, interest groups, and the media. Popular examples of linkage institutions within the United States include the NRA, AARP, NAACP, and BBC.

Development

Government is formed as a legitimate alternative to violence. These governments create policy making institutions to develop rules by which conflicts within society are to abide by. Democratic governments often elect a legislative body. Monarchies develop a single arbitrator. Aristocracies develop a privileged body of individuals. All of which centralized authority, develop an institutionalized structure, and provides a means by which policy is made. Dynamic social change occasionally require rules within a society to change. Linkage institutions provide the means to connect those individuals within a society to the centralized authority.

Political exclusions and oligarchical tendencies within societies create "linkage failures". These events create contentions within society and act as motivators towards social protests and rebellion.

See also
 Institution

References

Notes

Bibliography

Political activism
Social institutions